Aleksandr Yevgenyevich Bukharov (born 12 March 1985) is a Russian former footballer who played as a striker.

Career
With FC Rubin Kazan he won the Russian Premier League 2008. At that season he broke the record for the fastest goal in the Russian Premier League, scoring after 26 seconds. On 19 July 2010 signed four-year contract with FC Zenit Saint Petersburg.

On 22 February 2018, he was released from his FC Rostov contract by mutual consent.

On 25 July 2018, he returned to FC Rubin Kazan, signing a one-year contract. He left Rubin upon the expiration of his contract on 17 June 2019.

International career
He made his debut for the Russian national team in October 2009 in a 2010 FIFA World Cup qualifier against Azerbaijan. After 6 years without call-ups, he returned to the national team for two friendly games in March 2017.

Career statistics

Club

Notes

International goals
Scores and results list Russia's goal tally first.

External links
 Player page on the official FC Rubin Kazan website 
 
 Profile at Zenit site
 Player profile

References

1985 births
People from Naberezhnye Chelny
Living people
Russian footballers
Association football forwards
Russia under-21 international footballers
Russia national football B team footballers
Russia international footballers
FC Chernomorets Novorossiysk players
FC Rubin Kazan players
FC Zenit Saint Petersburg players
FC Anzhi Makhachkala players
FC Rostov players
Russian Premier League players
2017 FIFA Confederations Cup players
Sportspeople from Tatarstan